Leon County is a county in the U.S. state of Texas. As of the 2020 census, its population was 15,719. Its county seat is Centerville.

History 
The legislature of the Republic of Texas authorized Leon County in 1846 from part of Robertson County, and named it in honor of Martín de León, the founder of Victoria, Texas. However, local tradition holds that it is named for a yellow wolf of the region commonly called the león (Spanish for lion). The county was organized that same year, with its first county seat at Leona. In 1851, the county seat was moved to Centerville, since Leona was in the far southern part of the county.

The 1886 Leon County Courthouse was designed by architect George Edwin Dickey of Houston, incorporating remnants of an earlier 1858 courthouse that was destroyed by fire.  The courthouse was rededicated on July 1, 2007, following a full restoration to a 1909 date.

Geography

Major highways
  Interstate 45
  U.S. Highway 79
  State Highway 7
  State Highway 75
  State Highway 164

Additionally, State Highway OSR runs along the south and southwest county line of Leon County, where it borders with Madison County.

Adjacent counties
 Freestone County (north)
 Anderson County (northeast)
 Houston County (east)
 Madison County (south)
 Robertson County (west)
 Limestone County (northwest)

Demographics

Note: the US Census treats Hispanic/Latino as an ethnic category. This table excludes Latinos from the racial categories and assigns them to a separate category. Hispanics/Latinos can be of any race.

As of the census of 2000,  15,335 people, 6,189 households, and 4,511 families were residing in the county. The population density was 14 people/sq mi (6/km2). The 8,299 housing units averaged 8/sq mi (3/km2). The racial makeup of the county was 83.53% White, 10.39% African American, 0.34% Native American, 0.18%  Asian,  4.50% from other races, and 1.06% from two or more races. About 7.91% of the population were Hispanics or Latinos of any race.

Of the 6,189 households, 28.20% had children under 18 living with them, 60.20% were married couples living together, 9.20% had a female householder with no husband present, and 27.10% were not families. About 24.80% of all households were made up of individuals, and 13.10% had someone living alone who was 65  or older. The average household size was 2.46, and the average family size was 2.92.

In the county, the age distribution was 24.3% under 18, 6.7% from 18 to 24, 23.4% from 25 to 44, 25.6% from 45 to 64, and 20.0% who were 65  or older. The median age was 42 years. For every 100 females there were 96.40 males. For every 100 females age 18 and over, there were 92.70 males.

The median income for a household in the county was $30,981, and for a family was $38,029. Males had a median income of $32,036 versus $19,607 for females. The per capita income for the county was $17,599. About 12.60% of families and 15.60% of the population were below the poverty line, including 21.20% of those under age 18 and 14.30% of those age 65 or over.

Communities

Cities
 Buffalo
 Centerville (county seat)
 Jewett
 Leona
 Marquez

Towns
 Normangee (small part in Madison County)
 Oakwood (small part in Freestone County)

Census-designated place
 Hilltop Lakes

Unincorporated communities
 Centerville
 Concord
 Corinth
 Flynn
 Hopewell
 Wealthy

Ghost town
 Egypt

Politics
Leon County is so heavily Republican that in 2014 none of the statewide GOP nominees fell below 87 percent of the votes cast. U.S. Representative Kevin Brady of Texas's 8th congressional district led the ticket with 97 percent of the ballots cast in Leon County.

See also

 National Register of Historic Places listings in Leon County, Texas
 Recorded Texas Historic Landmarks in Leon County

References

External links
 Leon County government's website
 in Handbook of Texas Online at the University of Texas

 
1846 establishments in Texas
Populated places established in 1846